The Mercedes-Benz L3000 was a 4x2 3-tonne rear axle drive truck used by Nazi Germany in World War II, powered by a Daimler-Benz OM 65/4 74 hp 4-cylinder diesel engine. It was used alongside the Opel Blitz, and proved even more reliable in rough terrain; and was used in all fronts and extensively by the Afrika Korps. It was manufactured in three versions, the L3000, the L3000A, and the L3000S, from 1938 to 1944. When production was discontinued, more than 27,700 L3000 type trucks had been built, making it the most produced Mercedes-Benz truck of World War II.

History 

From 1896, Daimler Motoren Gesellschaft built not only passenger cars, but also light and heavy trucks with a payload of up to 10 t for the civilian and military sectors. The Reichswehr also used 3-ton trucks as a personnel carrier. Daimler-Benz in 1934 produced some off-road test vehicles under the name Mercedes-Benz LG 63, which went on to successful testing as a Mercedes-Benz LG 3000 in mass production and were delivered from 1936 to the Wehrmacht, Reichspost, Reichsbahn and business operations.

The L3000 was used in all major theaters of World War II where German forces were deployed, and was also used by civilian fire departments.

Variants 

L3000 - civil version
L3000A - military version with all-wheel drive
L3000S - military version using some standardized parts

Technical data 

() Figures in brackets: For driving offroad

In Popular Culture 
A replica of an L3000 based on the chassis of a GMC CCKW appears in the 1981 film Raiders Of The Lost Ark. It is involved in the film's most famous chase scene.

A modified Lo 2000 or L3000 truck carrying a detachment of SS Einsatzkommandos appears on the village arrival scene of the 1983 British Horror film The Keep, set in Romania in 1941.

See also
Mercedes-Benz Lo 2000

References

Notes

Bibliography 
 Oswald, Werner: Kraftfahrzeuge und Panzer der Reichswehr, Wehrmacht und Bundeswehr. Motorbuch Verlag, Stuttgart 1982. (in german)
Frank, Reinhard: Mercedes im Kriege - Personenwagen, Lastkraftwagen, Sonderaufbauten. PODZUN-PALLAS-VERLAG, Dorheim. 1985.

External links 
 Mercedes Benz L 3000 S kfz der Wehrmacht
 fahrzeuge der Wehrmacht - Mercedes 3000 (in German)
 Wehrmacht Technik - Technical details, 3 views, pictures of the Mercedes Benz L 3000 (in German)

World War II vehicles of Germany
Military trucks of Germany
L
Military vehicles introduced in the 1930s
Military vehicles of Germany